Lorium was an ancient village of ancient Etruria, Italy, along the Via Aurelia, 19 km west of Rome. The 15th emperor of the Roman Empire, Antoninus Pius, who was educated here, afterwards built a palace, in which he died. It was also a favorite haunt of Pius' successor as emperor, Marcus Aurelius.

Remains of ancient buildings exist in the neighborhood of the road on each side (near the modern Castel di Guido) and remains of tombs, inscriptions, etc., were excavated in 1823–1824. Parts of an elite villa have been excavated near Castel di Guido as well. Three or four kilometres farther west was probably the post-station of Baebiana, where inscriptions show that some sailors of the fleet were stationed; no doubt a detachment of those at Centumcellae, which was reached by this road.

References

Ancient Italian history
Roman towns and cities in Italy
Etruria